David Nalbandian was the defending champion but lost the final on a walkover against Guillermo Coria.

Seeds
A champion seed is indicated in bold text while text in italics indicates the round in which that seed was eliminated.

  Andy Roddick (semifinals)
  Roger Federer (second round)
  Guillermo Coria (champion)
  David Nalbandian (final, withdrew because of a left wrist injury)
  Jiří Novák (second round)
  Mark Philippoussis (withdrew)
  Martin Verkerk (first round)
  Tommy Robredo (second round)

Draw

 NB: The Final was the best of 5 sets while all other rounds were the best of 3 sets.

Final

Section 1

Section 2

External links
 2003 Davidoff Swiss Indoors Draw

2003 ATP Tour
2003 Davidoff Swiss Indoors